Bernardo Corradi (born 30 March 1976) is an Italian former footballer who played as a forward, and current coach. He played top-division football for several teams in Italy, Spain, and England, and last played for Canadian side Montreal Impact of Major League Soccer in 2012.

He is also a former Italian international, with 13 caps and two goals from 2003 to 2004. Corradi represented his country at UEFA Euro 2004.

He is currently in charge as head of the Italy U17 team.

Club career

Early career
Corradi began his career in Italy with Siena, at that time at Serie C1. He then left for U.S. Poggibonsi of Serie C2. He played there for two seasons, one in Serie C2 and the second in Serie D. In 1996, he left for Serie C2 club A.S.D. Mobilieri Ponsacco Calcio, also located in Tuscany. In mid-1997, he joined Cagliari of Sardinia, and after two matches, he was loaned to Montevarchi in November. In the next season, he was loaned to Andria. In 1999, he returned to Cagliari and played his first Serie A match.

Chievo and Inter Milan
In 2000, Corradi was jointly signed by Chievo and Inter Milan. Using his height as ability, he started showing his talent as central forward and scored his first Serie A goal at Chievo. He stayed at the club for two seasons, until Inter paid €4 million to purchase him outright.

Considered the ideal understudy to Christian Vieri, he played his first and only match for Inter against Sporting Clube de Portugal. After Ronaldo left the club for Real Madrid, Inter signed Lazio's Hernán Crespo, and sent Corradi in the opposite direction as part of the deal, in which Crespo was valued at €38 million and Corradi  at €12 million. Lazio later brought down Corradi's value to €5.5 million and the rest deferred to amortize in a 10-year special amortization fund.

Lazio
At Lazio, Corradi scored on his debut, and formed a strike partnership with Claudio López, while Enrico Chiesa and Simone Inzaghi played as substitutes. He was offered a contract extension in July 2003. In the second season, he was the first choice, and partnered with Roberto Muzzi, Lopez or Inzaghi. Corradi scored ten goals in both his league seasons with the club, and also scored a vital away goal when Lazio beat Juventus to the 2004 Coppa Italia title.

Valencia
Corradi signed for Valencia in the summer of 2004, along with Lazio teammate Stefano Fiore, in a deal which also repaid unpaid transfer fees (€16.6 million) incurred when Gaizka Mendieta moved from Valencia to Lazio for €42 million, while Corradi was valued at €10 million. Corradi opened his season with the Spanish club by winning the UEFA Supercup. However, once compatriot coach Claudio Ranieri left the club, he found his first team appearances becoming less frequent, as he fell out of form. He was loaned back to Italy, playing for Parma for the 2005–06 season, in which he scored ten times in 36 appearances.

Manchester City
In the 2006 close season he was sold by Valencia to Manchester City for an undisclosed fee on 20 July, signing a three-year contract with the Premier League club.

Corradi made his Manchester City debut in the opening match of the 2006–07 Premier League season against Chelsea, but was sent off after receiving a second yellow card due to his reaction to an incident involving Michael Essien. It took Corradi until his 13th Manchester City appearance before he scored his first goals for the club, when he scored twice against Fulham on 18 November 2006, becoming the first Italian to score for the club. In December Corradi was again sent off for two yellow cards, this time against Manchester United, with the second for attempting to win a penalty by diving. The sending off in the Manchester Derby infuriated Stuart Pearce, who believed it was justified.

Corradi lost his starting place to Emile Mpenza, as he only scored three league goals during the 2006–07 season, his other goal coming in a defeat to Portsmouth in February. Corradi looked to be leaving Manchester City after his poor season. When Sven-Göran Eriksson was appointed as their new manager, Corradi was given a chance to impress and took it well by scoring four goals in the pre-season of 2007. However, he did not feature in any of their Premier League or League Cup games and was subsequently loaned out again to  Parma for the rest of the season.

Corradi impressed during his first couple of appearances for his new club, but again got himself into disciplinary problems, when he was sent off in the first half, during a match with Roma. He finished with a tally of 5 goals in 15 starts, and was given the captain's armband.

Reggina and Udinese
On 30 July 2008, Manchester City confirmed that Corradi had been released from the final year of his contract, to return to Italy, and play for Reggina. On 31 May 2009, they terminated his contract with them.

On 3 July, he was signed for free by Udinese, who played him mainly as a substitute.

Montreal Impact
Corradi made his Impact debut in a 1–0 pre-season exhibition victory over BK Häcken of Sweden on 3 March 2012.  He replaced Justin Mapp to start the second half, and played out the final 45 minutes of the match. On 15 March 2012, the Montreal Impact announced that he had signed for three months with the option to extend. He recorded his first MLS goal on 14 April in the 61st minute against FC Dallas with a penalty kick.

Corradi was released by Montreal on 7 December 2012.

International career
Corradi won a total of 13 caps for Italy between 2003 and 2004, scoring two goals. He was considered as a replacement for Christian Vieri when he was first called up to the national team under Giovanni Trapattoni in February 2003; he debuted on 12 February, scoring the only goal of the match in a 1–0 friendly home win over Portugal. He was later included in their Euro 2004 squad, making one appearance throughout the tournament in his nation's 2–1 win over Bulgaria in their final group match, although Italy were eliminated in the first round on head-to-head record, despite not losing a match, following a three-way five-point tie with Denmark and Sweden.

Along with Valencia teammate Marco Di Vaio, he was played up front by new Italy national football team coach Marcello Lippi in the first few matches of qualification for the 2006 FIFA World Cup in late 2004. After the rise of Luca Toni and Alberto Gilardino, while Corradi struggled at Valencia, he did not receive an international call-up again.

Style of play
Often described as an "old-fashioned" centre-forward in the Italian media, Corradi was a tall, powerful, and physically strong striker, with an eye for goal, who excelled in the air; he was also known for his work-rate off the ball, and his ability to press defenders in order to help his team win back possession. During his prime, his playing style drew comparisons with that of Pierluigi Casiraghi.

Coaching career
In 2017, he joined the youth ranks of the Italian national team as an assistant to Italy U17 head coach Carmine Nunziata. He subsequently worked as head coach of the Italy U16 and Italy U18, before returning to the Under-17 team in 2020, this time as a head coach.

Television career
Bernardo Corradi (in couple with the dancer Stefano De Martino) in May–June 2017 is one of the tutors/mentors in the second season of Selfie – Le cose cambiano, a talent show produced by Fascino PGT of Maria De Filippi and aired by Canale 5 with Simona Ventura as presenter.

Personal life
In June 2014, Corradi married the Italian model Elena Santarelli.

Career statistics

Club

International

International appearances and goals

Honours

Club
Valencia
UEFA Super Cup: 2004

Lazio
Coppa Italia:  2003–04

References

External links

Profile at FIGC  

Profile at AIC  

Profile at La Gazzetta dello Sport  

archivio.inter.it
Profile at Italia1910.com 

Italian footballers
Italy international footballers
Association football forwards
A.C.N. Siena 1904 players
F.C. Ponsacco 1920 S.S.D. players
Cagliari Calcio players
S.S. Fidelis Andria 1928 players
A.C. ChievoVerona players
Inter Milan players
S.S. Lazio players
Valencia CF players
Parma Calcio 1913 players
Manchester City F.C. players
Reggina 1914 players
Udinese Calcio players
CF Montréal players
Serie A players
Serie B players
La Liga players
Premier League players
Major League Soccer players
UEFA Euro 2004 players
Sportspeople from Siena
1976 births
Living people
Italian expatriate footballers
Expatriate footballers in Spain
Expatriate footballers in England
Expatriate soccer players in Canada
Italian expatriate sportspeople in Spain
Italian expatriate sportspeople in England
Footballers from Tuscany